The Coffeyville Journal is a two-day (Wednesday-Saturday) newspaper covering the city of Coffeyville, Kansas with a circulation of approximately 1,800.

References

Newspapers published in Kansas
Montgomery County, Kansas